Dinner for Five is a television program in which actor and film director Jon Favreau and a revolving guest list of celebrities eat, drink and talk. The program aired on the Independent Film Channel with Favreau the co-executive producer with Peter Billingsley.

Format 
The show format was a spontaneous, open forum for people in the entertainment community. The idea, originally conceived by Favreau, originated from a time when he went out to dinner with colleagues on a film location and exchanged filming anecdotes. Favreau said, "I thought it would be interesting to show people that side of the business". He did not want to present them in a "sensationalized way [that] they're presented in the press, but as normal people". The format featured Favreau and four guests from the entertainment industry in a restaurant with no other diners. They ordered actual food from real menus and were served by authentic waiters. There were no cue cards or previous research on the participants that would have allowed him to orchestrate the conversation and the guests were allowed to talk about whatever they wanted. The show used five cameras with the operators using long lenses so that they could be at least ten feet away from the table and not intrude on the conversation or make the guests self-conscious. The conversations lasted until the film ran out. A 25-minutes episode would be edited from the two-hour dinner.  The one exception to the standard format was Favreau having a conversation with Martin Scorsese, done in a more traditional interview style.

The show was canceled by IFC in favor of The Henry Rollins Show because the network felt that "four years in, we needed to make a change, and we needed to make a bold statement."

Netflix and the Independent Film Channel produced a special 50th episode of Dinner for Five, which premiered on IFC February 1, 2008 and is available on Netflix starting February 4, 2008. The 50th episode features Favreau and Vaughn, as well as Peter Billingsley, Justin Long and Keir O'Donnell, who appear in Vince Vaughn's Wild West Comedy Show.

A DVD was released by Fox Lorber in 2004 of the complete first season. Subsequent DVDs were released by Fairview Entertainment in 2007 as "manufactured on demand when ordered from Amazon" discs. The Fairview DVDs aren't programmed as complete season, but under the aegis of "Jon Favreau presents his 10 most memorable moments/segments" from the series. These bear the titles "Favreau's Favorites", "Best Directors", "On The Road" and "Producer's Picks".

Guests

References

External links
 
 

2001 American television series debuts
2005 American television series endings
IFC (American TV channel) original programming
Television series created by Jon Favreau